Larry Ross may refer to:
 Larry Ross (speedway rider) (born 1954), New Zealand speedway rider
 Larry Ross (ice hockey)

See also
 Lawrence Ross, author of historical texts and fiction
 Lawrence Sullivan Ross, governor of Texas